is the 34th single by Japanese singer/songwriter Chisato Moritaka. Written by Moritaka and Yuichi Takahashi, the single was released by One Up Music on November 19, 1997. The song was used for TV commercials promoting Meiji's Melty Kiss chocolate.

The music video was filmed in parts of Hokkaido, including Niseko Station.

Chart performance 
"Snow Again" peaked at No. 9 on Oricon's singles chart and sold 134,000 copies, becoming Moritaka's last top 10 single. It was also her last single to be certified Gold by the RIAJ.

Other versions 
Moritaka re-recorded the song and uploaded the video on her YouTube channel on December 10, 2012. This version is also included in Moritaka's 2013 self-covers DVD album Love Vol. 3. She uploaded another self-cover of the song titled "Snow Again 2014" on December 12, 2014 This version is included in the 2015 self-covers DVD album Love Vol. 8.

Track listing 
All lyrics are written by Chisato Moritaka; all music is arranged by Yuichi Takahashi.

Personnel 
 Chisato Moritaka – vocals, drums
 Yuichi Takahashi – acoustic guitar, keyboard
 Shin Hashimoto – piano, keyboard, Fender Rhodes, synthesizer
 Yukio Seto – electric guitar, bass

Chart positions

Certification

Cover versions 
 Runa Miyoshida covered the song in her 2008 album Love Gift ～pure flavor extra～.
 Sakura Nogawa covered the song in her 2010 cover album Winter Song Cover Best.

References

External links 
 
 
 

1997 singles
1997 songs
Japanese-language songs
Japanese Christmas songs
Chisato Moritaka songs
Songs with lyrics by Chisato Moritaka
Songs about weather
One Up Music singles